Events in the year 1992 in  Israel.

Incumbents
 President of Israel – Chaim Herzog
 Prime Minister of Israel – Yitzhak Shamir (Likud) until 13 July, Yitzhak Rabin (Israeli Labor Party)
 President of the Supreme Court – Meir Shamgar
 Chief of General Staff – Ehud Barak
 Government of Israel – 24th Government of Israel until 13 July, 25th Government of Israel

Events

 9 March – The Israeli left-wing political party Meretz is formed by an alliance of three left-wing parties; Ratz, Mapam and Shinui, and is initially led by Shulamit Aloni.
 9 May – Dafna Dekel represents Israel at the Eurovision Song Contest with the song “Ze Rak Sport” ("It’s Just Sport"), achieving sixth place.
 23 June – The Elections for the 13th Knesset are held in Israel. The result is a victory for Yitzhak Rabin's Israeli Labor Party.
 13 July – Yitzhak Rabin presents his cabinet for a Knesset "Vote of Confidence". The 25th Government is approved that day and the members are sworn in.
 28 July – Carmelit reopened after intensive renovation from 1986.
 30 July – Yael Arad wins a silver medal in judo in the 1992 Summer Olympics. This was the first Olympic medal won by an Israeli athlete.
 4 October – The Bijlmerramp disaster: El Al Flight 1862, a Boeing 747 freighter, crashes into high-rise apartment buildings in Amsterdam after two of its engines detach from the wing. A total of 43 people were killed, consisting of the plane's crew of three and a non-revenue passenger in a jump seat, plus 39 persons on the ground. Many more were injured.
 5 November – Tze'elim II disaster: 5 Sayeret Matkal soldiers die in an accident while training for a military operation.

Israeli–Palestinian conflict 
The most prominent events related to the Israeli–Palestinian conflict which occurred during 1992 include:

 17 December – Israel deports 415 Hamas activists to Lebanon.

Notable Palestinian militant operations against Israeli targets

The most prominent Palestinian Arab terror attacks committed against Israelis during 1992 include:
 14 February – Night of the Pitchforks (ליל הקילשונים): Three Israeli soldiers are killed by Israeli Arabs at a military recruit training base near Kibbutz Gal'ed.
 17 March – A suicide car-bomb explodes at the Israeli Embassy in Buenos Aires, Argentina, killing 29 and injuring 242.
 24 May – Murder of Helena Rapp
 22 September – a border policeman, Avinoam Peretz, was killed at the French Hill neighborhood in northeastern Jerusalem. Hamas took responsibility.
 13 December – Hamas activists kidnap and kill an Israeli Border Police officer, Nissim Toledano. This event precipitated Israel's decision to deport 415 Hamas activists to the Lebanon four days later.

Notable Israeli military operations against Palestinian militancy targets

The most prominent Israeli military counter-terrorism operations (military campaigns and military operations) carried out against Palestinian militants during 1992 include:

Notable births

 14 January – Ahad Azam, footballer.
 4 June – Matan Balestra, footballer.
 16 August – Adi Gotlieb, footballer.
 9 December – Sean Labanowski, basketball player.

Notable deaths

 9 March – Menachem Begin (born 1913), Russian (Belarus)-born Prime Minister of Israel, recipient of the Nobel Peace Prize.
 18 June – Mordecai Ardon (born 1896), Austro-Hungarian (Galicia)-born Israeli painter.
 22 July – Ya'akov Hazan (born 1899), Russian (Belarus)-born Israeli politician and social activist.
 10 August – Shimon Agranat (born 1906), American-born former President of the Supreme Court of Israel.
 Full date unknown
 Dina Feitelson (born 1926), Austrian-born Israeli educator.
 Gad Tedeschi (born 1907) Italian-born Israeli jurist.

Major public holidays

See also
 1992 in Israeli film
 1992 in Israeli television
 1992 in Israeli music
 1992 in Israeli sport
 Israel in the Eurovision Song Contest 1992
 Israel at the 1992 Summer Olympics

References

External links

 IDF History in 1992 @ dover.idf.il